Aïchata Doumbia (born 20 August 1985) is a Malian footballer who plays as a midfielder. She has been a member of the Mali women's national team.

International career
Doumbia was capped for Mali at senior level during the 2016 Africa Women Cup of Nations.

References

1985 births
Living people
Malian women's footballers
Mali women's international footballers
Women's association football midfielders
21st-century Malian people